Canal+ Comedy was a Scandinavian premium television channel showing a comedy movies and television shows. It was replaced by Canal+ Series on 1 April 2010.

References

External links

Television channels and stations established in 2006
Television channels and stations disestablished in 2010
Defunct television channels in Sweden
TV4 AB